The American Idols Live! Tour 2015 was a summer concert tour in the United States that featured the Top 5 finalists of the 14th season of American Idol. The tour began on July 7, 2015, in Clearwater, Florida and ended on August 28, 2015, in Riverside, California. Like the previous tour, the size of venues were smaller and for the first time the tour featured the Top 5 instead of the usual Top 10. After not having a live band for the 2014 tour, there was one for this tour. This was also the final Idol tour when the show aired on Fox as the 2016 tour was canceled. The tour was revived in 2018.

Performers

Setlist
 Top 5 – "Are You Gonna Go My Way" (Lenny Kravitz)
 Nick Fradiani – "American Girl" (Tom Petty)
 Clark Beckham – "Georgia on My Mind" (Ray Charles)
 Jax – "My Generation" (The Who), "Brick by Boring Brick" (Paramore), "Are You Gonna Be My Girl" (Jet)
 Rayvon Owen – "Love Me like You Do" (Ellie Goulding), "Jealous" (with Beckham and Tyanna Jones on backing vocals) (Nick Jonas)
 Beckham, Jones and Owen – "Chandelier" (Sia)
 Jax – "White Flag" (Dido), "Forcefield" (Jax), "You Give Love a Bad Name" (Bon Jovi)
 Beckham, Jax, Jones and Owen – "Lie to Me" (Jonny Lang)
 Top 5 (except Jones in first song and Fradiani in second song) – "Bless the Broken Road" (Rascal Flatts), "I Bet My Life" (Imagine Dragons)
 Beckham – "I Won't Give Away" (Clark Beckham)
 Fradiani – "Honey, I'm Good." (Andy Grammer)
 Jones –  "Lips Are Movin" (with Jax and Owen on backing vocals) (Meghan Trainor)
 Jax – "Love is Your Name" (Steven Tyler)
 Owen – "Wide Awake" and "Thinkin Bout You" (with Beckham and Jones on backing vocals) (Katy Perry and Frank Ocean)
 Beckham – "Earned It" (The Weeknd), "Sunday Morning" (Maroon 5)
 Jones – "Sweet Dreams" (Beyoncé)
 Beckham – "Give Me One Reason" (Tracy Chapman)
 Top 5 (except Fradiani) – "People Like Us" (Kelly Clarkson)

Intermission
 Fradiani – "Coming Your Way" (Beach Avenue), "I Won't Give Up" (Jason Mraz), "No Diggity" (Blackstreet), "Beautiful Life" (with Beckham, Jax, Jones and Owen on backing vocals) (Nick Fradiani)
 Top 5 – "See You Again" (Charlie Puth), "Some Nights" (Fun)

Tour dates

References

American Idol concert tours
2015 concert tours